Lie with Me or Lie With Me may refer to:
 Lie with Me (film), a 2005 Canadian movie
 Lie with Me (2004 TV series), a British television crime drama series
 Lie With Me (2021 TV series), an Australian/British television thriller drama series
 Lie with Me (novel), a 2017 novel by Philippe Besson